Nelson Delle-Vigne Fabbri (born in 1949) is an Italian classical pianist and pedagogue.

Biography 
Born in Argentina, after studying the piano with Magda Tagliaferro, György Cziffra and Claudio Arrau, Delle-Vigne Fabbri embarks on a career of concertist and pedagogue. He teaches at the École Normale de Musique de Paris (Alfred Cortot), the Queen Elisabeth Music Chapel and gives master classes in South Korea, Spain, the United States, France, Greece, Italy, the Netherlands, Portugal and Switzerland. He is also co-founder, artistic director and general coordinator of the International Certificate for Piano Artists, high level educational program chaired by Philippe Entremont and co-organized by the École Normale de Musique de Paris and the music faculty of the University of Florida. Delle-Vigne Fabbri is also artistic director of the Bell'Arte Foundation of Braine-l'Alleud in Belgium. During his brilliant career as a virtuoso pianist, Delle-Vigne Fabbri has premiered numerous works by European, American and South American composers. Among these is "Symbiosis" by Didier Van Damme.

References

External links 
 Discography (Discogs)
 Website of the Bell'Arte Foundation
 Nelson Delle-Vigne Fabbri (AllMusic) 

Italian classical pianists
Male classical pianists
Italian male pianists
Italian music educators
Academic staff of the École Normale de Musique de Paris
1949 births
Living people
21st-century classical pianists
21st-century Italian male musicians